Dresslerella pilosissima is a species of orchid native to Costa Rica and Guatemala.

References

pilosissima
Orchids of Central America
Plants described in 1923